The Other Side of the Mountain: Mujahadeen Tactics in the Soviet-Afghan War is a 1998 non-fiction book written by former Afghan Army Colonel Ali Ahmad Jalali and American military scholar Lester W. Grau.

Background 
The book was commissioned by the United States Marine Corps Studies and Analysis Division to complement Grau's previous book, "The Bear Went Over the Mountain." Jalali and Grau had planned travel into Afghanistan to interview Mujahideen fighters in late 1996, but were forced to remain in Pakistan when a Taliban offensive campaign started to seize major portions of Afghanistan, eventually capturing Kabul on September 27. Jalali interviewed approximately 40 Mujahideen during the month which the authors spent in Pakistan and an associate, Major Nasrullah Safi, conducted interviews inside Afghanistan for two months to collect additional data.

Synopsis 
"The Other Side of the Mountain" is a compilation of selected anecdotes from Afghan Mujahideen recollecting their various combat actions against Soviet forces during the Soviet-Afghan War. The 92 vignettes along with accompanying maps including operational graphics are arranged chronologically and assembled topically, based on type of action, into 14 chapters. Each chapter opens with a brief summary and a simple map depicting the general locations of the vignettes inside Afghanistan. Soviet operational graphics were used in the detailed vignette maps, since the Afghan Army used them and many Mujahideen were familiar with them. The 15th chapter concludes the book by assessing the technology, command challenges, effects of decentralized command, professionalism, logistics, and tactics used by the Mujahideen.

Title 
The title alludes to Lester Grau's previous book, "The Bear Went Over the Mountain,"  which presented the Soviet–Afghan War solely from the Soviet perspective. This book focuses on the Mujahideen perspective, thus the "other side" of the mountain.

Reception 
William C. Green declares that Jalali's and Grau's "highly readable compilation is a significant contribution to the literature on guerilla warfare" in a review for Naval War College Review. He is critical of the book's topical organization, states that the book is geographically biased, and claims that the "proofing and editing is distractingly bad." Despite these shortcomings, Green still lauds its value as a compilation of first-hand accounts of a successful insurgency but urges revisions so that subsequent editions can better educate American military personnel operating in Afghanistan.

See also 
 1973 Afghan coup d'état
 Afghanistan
 Afghanistan conflict (1978–present)
 Afghanistan Mujahedin Freedom Fighters Front
 Democratic Republic of Afghanistan
 Fourth-generation warfare
 Guerrilla warfare
 Hezbi Islami
 Inter-Services Intelligence
 Irregular warfare
 Islamic Movement of Afghanistan
 Islamic State of Afghanistan
 Islamic Unity of Afghanistan Mujahideen
 Jamiat-e Islami
 KHAD
 Kingdom of Afghanistan
 Lester W. Grau
 Low-intensity conflict
 Operation Cyclone
 People's Democratic Party of Afghanistan
 Qawm
 Republic of Afghanistan (1973–1978)
 Saur Revolution
 Soviet war crimes
 Soviet withdrawal from Afghanistan
 Taliban
 Tehran Eight
 Unconventional Warfare

External links 

 The Other Side of the Mountain: Mujahadeen Tactics in the Soviet-Afghan War (complete text) in Portable Document Format from the Defense Technical Information Center

References 

1998 non-fiction books
American non-fiction books
Books about Afghanistan
Books about the Cold War
Military strategy books
Non-fiction books about war
Public domain books
Works about the Soviet–Afghan War